Evergestis dilutalis is an elusive species of moth in the family Crambidae. It is found in Romania and Ukraine.

Adults are on wing from the end of June to July.

This species has not been spotted in the last forty years.

References

Moths described in 1848
Evergestis
Moths of Europe